Tommaso Olivieri (1660 – February 1719) was a Roman Catholic prelate who served as Bishop of Strongoli (1706–1719).

Biography
Tommaso Olivieri was born in Cutro, Italy.
On 25 Jun 1706, he was appointed by Pope Clement XI as Bishop of Strongoli. 
He served as Bishop of Strongoli until his death in February 1719.

References

External links and additional sources
 (for Chronology of Bishops) 
 (for Chronology of Bishops) 

1660 births
1719 deaths
People from the Province of Crotone
18th-century Italian Roman Catholic bishops
Bishops appointed by Pope Clement XI